The Guru is a 1969 film by Merchant Ivory Productions, with a screenplay by Ruth Prawer Jhabvala and James Ivory.

Plot
A rock star, Tom Pickle (Michael York), travels to India to learn to play the sitar with the great musician Ustad Zafar Khan (as George Harrison did when he studied under Ravi Shankar). Khan (Utpal Dutt) is not happy with his disciple but still takes him to Benares to meet his own guru.

Cast

Rita Tushingham - Jenny
Michael York - Tom Pickle
Utpal Dutt - Ustal Zafar Khan
Madhur Jaffrey - Begum Sahiba
Barry Foster  - Chris
Aparna Sen - Ghazala
Zohra Sehgal - Mastani
Saeed Jaffrey - Murad

Box office
According to Fox records, the film required $1,675,000 in theatrical rentals to break even. By 11 December 1970, it had only made $625,000 in rentals, causing the studio to take a loss.

References

External links
 
Merchant Ivory overview

1969 films
Films about Indian Americans
English-language Indian films
Merchant Ivory Productions films
Films directed by James Ivory
Films with screenplays by Ruth Prawer Jhabvala
Films scored by Vilayat Khan
Films with screenplays by James Ivory